Jonathan Hirschi (born 2 February 1986 in St. Imier, Switzerland) is a Swiss racing and rally driver who currently competes in the European Le Mans Series with Duqueine Engineering.

24 Hours of Le Mans results

References

Swiss racing drivers
World Rally Championship drivers
24 Hours of Le Mans drivers
1986 births
Living people
Blancpain Endurance Series drivers
24 Hours of Spa drivers
Manor Motorsport drivers

Status Grand Prix drivers
HVM Racing drivers
Graff Racing drivers
Jaguar Racing drivers
Emil Frey Racing drivers
Tech 1 Racing drivers
Murphy Prototypes drivers
TDS Racing drivers
Nürburgring 24 Hours drivers
Saintéloc Racing drivers
Boutsen Ginion Racing drivers